Yazan Al Bawwab (Arabic: يزان بواب; born 30 October 1999) is a Palestinian swimmer.

Al-Bawwab is one of five Palestinians who represented the country in the 2020 Tokyo Olympics. He competed in the men's 100 meter freestyle at the Tokyo Aquatics Center.

He holds the Palestinian record in both the 50 and 100 metre freestyle events.

Personal life
Al-Bawwab grew up in Dubai and holds both Palestinian and Italian citizenship. Al-Bawwab is an engineering alumni Carleton University in Ottawa.

He is currently living in Ottawa.

References

External links
 

Living people
1999 births
Palestinian male swimmers
Olympic swimmers of Palestine
Swimmers at the 2020 Summer Olympics
People from Ramallah
Sportspeople from Dubai
Carleton University alumni